Mesopsocus blancae is a species of Psocoptera from the Mesopsocidae family that is endemic to Spain.

References

Mesopsocidae
Insects described in 1988
Endemic fauna of Spain
Psocoptera of Europe